The 2008 Great Yarmouth Borough Council election took place on 1 May 2008 to elect members of Great Yarmouth Borough Council in Norfolk, England. One third of the council was up for election and the Conservative Party stayed in overall control of the council.

After the election, the composition of the council was:
Conservative 24
Labour 15

Background
13 seats were contested at the election with both the Conservative and Labour parties contesting every seat, while the Liberal Democrats had 6 candidates, the United Kingdom Independence Party 3 and the Green Party 2.

Election result
The results saw the Conservatives increase their majority on the council after gaining two seats from Labour. This took the Conservatives to 24 seats, compared to 15 for Labour, while none of the other parties who contested the election won any seats. Overall turnout at the election was 30.02%, slightly down on the over 31% in 2007.

One of the two Conservatives gains came in Bradwell North, where the leader of the Labour group on the council, Trevor Wainwright, lost by 48 votes. Wainwright put his defeat down to national issues and in particular the abolition of the 10p rate of income tax. The other Conservative gain came in Magdalen ward where councillor Colleen Walker was defeated by Patricia Page by 64 votes. Among those to hold their seats were the Conservative leader of the council Barry Coleman and the Conservative mayor Paul Garrod. Coleman agreed that national events had effected the election saying "You can't help but think national issues came into play in this vote".

Following the election Mick Castle returned as leader of the Labour group on the council, after previously having been group leader from 2004 to 2006.

Ward results

References

2008 English local elections
2008
2000s in Norfolk